Fan Changmi (born June 1955) is a former lieutenant general of the People's Liberation Army of China. In December 2014, he was under investigation by the PLA's anti-corruption agency. He served as Deputy Political Commissar of the Lanzhou Military Region, one of the seven military regions in China, but was placed under investigation for corruption in 2014.

Fan was an alternate member of the 18th Central Committee of the Chinese Communist Party and a member of the 11th National People's Congress.

Life and career 
Fan was born and raised in Laoling, Shandong. He graduated from PLA Ground Force Command Academy in Nanjing.

He joined the People's Liberation Army in December 1972, and joined the Chinese Communist Party in April 1974. In 1998 he was appointed head of propaganda of the political department of the 47th Group Army, a position he held until 1999, when he was appointed head of Propaganda of the Political Department of the Lanzhou Military Region, later Director of the Political Department of the 21st Group Army. He attained the rank of major general in July 2004. In November 2005, he was appointed Director of the Political Department of the Xinjiang Military District, he remained in that position until December 2006, when he was transferred to the Nanjing Military Region, and appointed Political Commissar of the 47th Army. Fan served as Director of the Political Department of the Lanzhou MR from July 2012 to July 2014, and was appointed Deputy Political Commissar of the Lanzhou MR in July 2014. In December 2014, he was placed under investigation by the PLA's anti-corruption agency.

References 

1955 births
Living people
People's Liberation Army generals from Shandong
Deputy political commissars of the Lanzhou Military Region
Directors of the political department of the Lanzhou Military Region
Delegates to the 11th National People's Congress
Alternate members of the 18th Central Committee of the Chinese Communist Party
People's Liberation Army Nanjing Military Command College alumni
People's Liberation Army generals convicted of corruption